Il Makiage is a tech-focused beauty brand based in New York, United States.
In May 2020 they launched in the United Kingdom, launched in 2022, Canada in 2020, Germany in November 2020 and Australia in June 2021.

Name Origin
The name is an intentionally simplified version of the French word Maquillage, meaning "makeup."

Company overview
Il Makiage was founded in 1972 by New York-based makeup artist Ilana Harkavi.

In June 2017, L Catterton purchased a minority stake of the company for $29 million. After the initial investment, brother and sister Oran Holtzman and Shiran Holtzman-Erel, who had previously purchased the brand, re-launched it in 2018 and started its digital approach.

Since launching, L Catterton has increased their investment to $44 million.

Dmitri Kaplun is the present CEO of the company.

Technology 
The technology uses machine learning to match user's makeup foundation shade to skin tone using data from 700 different skin-tone combinations without seeing their face. In November 2019, Il Makiage acquired Israeli artificial-intelligence company NeoWize Inc. to integrate it with their machine learning programs. In August 2021, the company acquired computer vision startup Voyage81 to further enhance their AI and machine learning capabilities.

References

Israeli brands

he:איל מקיאג'